Robert E. Vigil (born October 26, 1953) is an American politician from the U.S. state of New Mexico. He was twice elected New Mexico State Auditor, serving from 1991 to 1998 and was New Mexico State Treasurer from 2003 until his resignation on October 26, 2005.

Arrest and conviction 
Vigil, his predecessor, Michael A. Montoya, and two others were indicted on 28 counts of extortion, money laundering and racketeering by a federal jury. Vigil's first trial ended in a hung jury, but was convicted in a second trial of one count of attempted extortion while being acquitted of 23 other extortion and racketeering charges. He was sentenced to 37 months in prison, serving his term in Colorado and Texas. He was moved to a halfway house in June 2009 before being released on probation in December the same year.

References

|-

1953 births
Hispanic and Latino American politicians
Living people
New Mexico Democrats
New Mexico politicians convicted of crimes
People from San Miguel County, New Mexico
Politicians convicted of extortion under color of official right
State auditors of New Mexico
State treasurers of New Mexico